Maybe a Love Story is a 2018 Brazilian romantic comedy movie based on the novel The Discreet Pleasures of Rejection by Martin Page. It was produced in Brazil and New York in 2015, directed by Rodrigo Bernardo, and starring Mateus Solano. It was released in Brazil on June 14, 2018.

Plot 
Virgilio (Mateus Solano) is a single and lonely man but everything changes when he answers the call of Clara (Thaila Ayala).

Cast 

 Mateus Solano as Virgílio
 Thaila Ayala as Clara
 Totia Meirelles as Marcia Bruner
Dani Calabresa as Lisa
Bianca Comparato as Katy
Nathalia Dill as Fernanda
 Paulo Vilhena as João
Juliana Didone as Melissa
Isabelle Drummond as Cintia
 Jacqueline Sato as Carolina
Marco Luque as Otavio
Cynthia Nixon as Toni
 Genero Camilo as Antonio
Elisa Lucinda as Simone
 Cláudia Alencar as Bianca
 João Côrtes as Lucas
 Flávia Botella as Denise

References

External links
 

2018 films
Brazilian romantic comedy films
2010s Portuguese-language films
2018 romantic comedy films